is a Japanese novelist, short story writer, essayist and filmmaker. His novels explore human nature through themes of disillusion, drug use, surrealism, murder and war, set against the dark backdrop of Japan. His best known novels are Almost Transparent Blue, Audition, Coin Locker Babies and In the Miso Soup.

Biography
Murakami was born  in Sasebo, Nagasaki on 19 February 1952.

Murakami attended school in Sasebo. While a student in senior high, he joined in forming a rock band called Coelacanth, as the drummer. In the summer of his third year in senior high, Murakami and his colleagues barricaded the rooftop of his high school and he was placed under house arrest for three months. During this time, he had an encounter with hippie culture, which had a strong influence on him.

After graduating from high school in 1970, Murakami formed another rock band and produced some 8-millimeter indie films. He enrolled in the silkscreen department at Gendaishichosha School of Art in Tokyo, but dropped out in the first year. In October 1972, he moved to Fussa, Tokyo and was accepted for the sculpture program at Musashino Art University. He married his wife, a keyboard player, in the 1970s and their son was born in 1980. In the early 1990s, Murakami devoted himself to disseminating Cuban music in Japan and established a label, Murakami's, within Sony Music.

Murakami started the e-magazine JMM (Japan Mail Media) in 1999 and still serves as its chief editor. Since 2006, he has also hosted a talk show on business and finance called Kanburia Kyuden, broadcast on TV Tokyo. The co-host is Eiko Koike. In the same year, he began a video streaming service, RVR (Ryu's Video Report). In 2010, he established a company, to sell and produce eBooks.

Works

Murakami's first work was the short novel Almost Transparent Blue, written while he was still a university student. It deals with promiscuity and drug use among disaffected youth. Critically acclaimed as a new style of literature, it won the Gunzo Prize for New Writers in 1976, despite some objections on the grounds of decadence. Later the same year, his Blue won the Akutagawa Prize, going on to become a bestseller.

In 1980, Murakami published a much longer novel, Coin Locker Babies, again to critical acclaim, and won the 3rd Noma Liberal Arts New Member Prize. Next came the autobiographical novel 69, and then Ai to Gensou no Fascism (1987), revolving around the struggle to reform Japan's survival-of-the-fittest society with a secret "Hunting Society". His work Topaz (1988) concerns a sado-masochistic woman's radical expression of her sexuality.

Murakami's The World in Five Minutes From Now (1994) is written as a point of view in a parallel universe version of Japan, and was nominated for the 30th Tanizaki Prize. In 1996 he continued his autobiography 69, and released the Murakami Ryū Movie and Novel Collection. He also won the Taiko Hirabayashi Prize. The same year, he wrote the novel Topaz II, about a female high school student engaged in "compensated dating", which later was adapted as the live-action film Love and Pop by anime director Hideaki Anno. His Popular Hits of the Showa Era concerns the escalating firepower in a battle between five teenage male and five middle-aged female social rejects.

In 1997 came the psychological thriller novel In the Miso Soup, set in Tokyo's Kabuki-cho red-light district, which won him the Yomiuri Prize for Fiction that year. Parasites (Kyōsei chū, 2000) is about a young hikikomori fascinated by war. It won him the 36th Tanizaki Prize. The same year Exodus From Hopeless Japan (Kibō no Kuni no Exodus) told of junior high school students who lose their desire to be involved in normal Japanese society and instead create a new one over the internet.

In 2001, Murakami became involved in his friend Ryuichi Sakamoto's group NML No More Landmines, which sets out to remove landmines from former battle sites around the world.

In 2004, Murakami announced the publication of 13 Year Old Hello Work, aimed at increasing interest in young people who are entering the workforce. Hantō wo Deyo (2005) is about an invasion of Japan by North Korea.

The novel Audition was made into a feature film by Takashi Miike. Murakami reportedly liked it so much he gave Miike his blessing to adapt Coin Locker Babies. The screenplay for the latter was worked on by director Jordan Galland but Miike failed to raise enough funding for it. An adaptation directed by Michele Civetta is currently in production.

Selected bibliography

Novels

Short story collections

English short stories

Non-fiction and essays

Interviews and letters

Picture book

Filmography

References

External links
 "Murakami Ryū" (The Encyclopedia of Science Fiction; by Jonathan Clements) 

Ryu Murakami at J'Lit Books from Japan 
Synopsis of Leave the Peninsula (Hanto o Deyo) at JLPP (Japanese Literature Publishing Project) 
REVIEW : Ryu Murakami - From the Fatherland With Love at Upcoming4.me 
Ryu Murakami at the Internet Movie Database

1952 births
Living people
Japanese film directors
Japanese psychological fiction writers
Writers from Nagasaki Prefecture
People from Sasebo
People from Fussa, Tokyo
20th-century Japanese novelists
21st-century Japanese novelists
Akutagawa Prize winners
Yomiuri Prize winners